Villecroze is a commune in the Var department in the Provence-Alpes-Côte d'Azur region in southeastern France.

See also
Communes of the Var department

References

External links

  Académie musicale de Villecroze
  Commanderie du Ruou, commandry of the Knights Templar

Communes of Var (department)